In geometry, a rhombic enneacontahedron (plural: rhombic enneacontahedra) is a polyhedron composed of 90 rhombic faces; with three, five, or six rhombi meeting at each vertex. It has 60 broad rhombi and 30 slim. The rhombic enneacontahedron is a zonohedron with a superficial resemblance to the rhombic triacontahedron.

Construction
It can also be seen as a nonuniform truncated icosahedron with pyramids augmented to the pentagonal and hexagonal faces with heights adjusted until the dihedral angles are zero, and the two pyramid type side edges are equal length. This construction is expressed in the Conway polyhedron notation jtI with join operator j. Without the equal edge constraint, the wide rhombi are kites if limited only by the icosahedral symmetry.

The sixty broad rhombic faces in the rhombic enneacontahedron are identical to those in the rhombic dodecahedron, with diagonals in a ratio of 1 to the square root of 2. The face angles of these rhombi are approximately 70.528° and 109.471°. The thirty slim rhombic faces have face vertex angles of 41.810° and 138.189°; the diagonals are in ratio of 1 to φ2.

It is also called a rhombic enenicontahedron in Lloyd Kahn's Domebook 2.

Close-packing density

The optimal packing fraction of rhombic enneacontahedra is given by
.
Since the rhombic enneacontahedron is contained in a rhombic dodecahedron whose
inscribed sphere is identical to its own inscribed sphere, the value of the optimal packing fraction is a corollary of the Kepler conjecture: it can be achieved by putting a rhombicuboctahedron in each cell of the rhombic dodecahedral honeycomb, and it cannot be surpassed, since otherwise the optimal packing density of spheres could be surpassed by putting a sphere in each rhombicuboctahedron of the hypothetical packing which surpasses it.

References

 
 VRML model: George Hart, 
 George Hart's Conway Generator Try dakD
 Domebook2 by Kahn, Lloyd (Editor); Easton, Bob; Calthorpe, Peter; et al., Pacific Domes, Los Gatos, CA (1971), page 102

External links

 The Rhombic Enneacontahedron and relations
Rhombic Enneacontahedron 
 George Hart
A Color-Matching Dissection of the Rhombic Enneacontahedron
Color-Matching Dissection of the Rhombic Enneacontahedron
 VRML model

Zonohedra